Pink Abyss is the third album recorded by Shalabi Effect. It was released on the Alien 8 label. The music combines experimental and modern rock with overtones of pop.

Track listing
 "Message from the Pink Abyss" – 2:54
 "Bright Guilty World" – 4:55
 "Shivapria" – 2:40
 "Blue Sunshine" – 3:42
 "Iron and Blood" – 8:53
 "I Believe in Love" – 3:37
 "Imps" – 4:28
 "Deep Throat" – 3:05
 "We'll Never Make It Out of Here Alive" – 8:49
 "Kinder Surprise" – 5:15

References

Shalabi Effect albums
2004 albums
Alien8 Recordings albums